= March 2013 Western Europe winter storm =

Snow event in Europe

Meteorological history
- Formed: 6 March 2013
- Dissipated: 17 March 2013

Blizzard
- Lowest pressure: 980 mbar (980 hPa)
- Max. snowfall: 24 in (61 cm): Northern France

Overall effects
- Areas affected: Southern England, Belgium, Northern France, Germany

The Western European winter storm March 2013 was a late season snow event that affected Southern England, Belgium, Northern France and Germany on 12 March 2013. It was notable for its effects particularly in Northern France where snowfall totals reached 24 in (61 cm).

== Overview and Impacts ==
Heavy snow and high winds were experienced in many northern and western countries in Europe.

=== Germany ===
In Germany, up to 5 in (13 cm) of snow was reported to have fallen on Frankfort Airport on the 12th. This was enough to close the airport for a time during the day and more than 200 flights were scrapped by late morning. Also on an autobahn north of Frankfurt, heavy snow contributed to an enormous vehicle-pile involving more than 100 cars and injuring at least 20 people.

=== France ===
France was worst affected with up to 24 in (61 cm) of snowfall in Northern parts of the country. Also, it was cold too with the maximum temperature in Paris being just −2 °C (28 °F). The heavy snow and high winds led to nearly a third of France's regions being on alert and the government activated a ministerial crisis group. More than 2,000 people were stranded in their cars overnight as heavy snow paralysed roads in Normandy and Brittany, with many spending the night in emergency shelters. Also, about 80,000 homes in the north and northwest of France were without power. The snow caused major disruptions as it moved into Paris, with authorities urging the seven million commuters who use public transport every day to stay home. Several major roads around the capital were closed and the city's two main airports, Charles de Gaulle Airport and Orly Airport, said they had cancelled up to a quarter of flights and the nearby Beauvais airport, serving mainly low-cost airlines, cancelled all flights. Conditions were also very difficult on the roads, a traffic accident near Lille injured 14 people. Also 58-year-old homeless man was found dead, presumably from the cold, outside a building in the town of Saint-Brieuc in Brittany.

=== England ===
Hundreds were also stuck in their cars overnight in Southern England, some for more than 10 hours as ice, snow and freezing winds descended on southeastern England. Maximum temperatures were as low as −3 °C (27 °F) in some places along with more than 10 cm (3.9 in) of snowfall.

=== Belgium and The Netherlands ===
In Belgium, the snowstorms caused massive traffic disruptions, with vehicles backed up on 1,600 kilometres (990 miles) of freeways due to snowdrifts and ice. Buses and trains were cancelled or delayed in Brussels and other towns and the high-speed Thalys service linking Paris and Brussels was suspended. Long traffic jams because of snow and ice also snaked along motorways in the southern Netherlands, hampering travel to and from Belgium after an unseasonal fall of more than 10 centimetres (four inches) of snow overnight.
